Spectamen plicatulum is a species of sea snail, a marine gastropod mollusk in the family Solariellidae.

Description
The height of the shell attains 4 mm, its diameter 6 mm. This species differs from the characteristics of the genus in having the longitudinal plications upon the upper part of the body whorl almost obsolete, and the two circumumbilical carinae are almost smooth.

Distribution
This marine species is endemic to New Zealand.

References

 Powell, A.W.B. 1979: New Zealand Mollusca: Marine, Land and Freshwater Shells. Collins, Auckland 500p 
 Spencer, H.G.; Marshall, B.A.; Maxwell, P.A.; Grant-Mackie, J.A.; Stilwell, J.D.; Willan, R.C.; Campbell, H.J.; Crampton, J.S.; Henderson, R.A.; Bradshaw, M.A.; Waterhouse, J.B.; Pojeta, J. Jr (2009). Phylum Mollusca: chitons, clams, tusk shells, snails, squids, and kin, in: Gordon, D.P. (Ed.) (2009). New Zealand inventory of biodiversity: 1. Kingdom Animalia: Radiata, Lophotrochozoa, Deuterostomia. pp. 161–254.

External links
 To Biodiversity Heritage Library (2 publications)
 To World Register of Marine Species
 B. Marshall (1999), A revision of the Recent Solariellinae (Gastropoda: Trochoidea) of the New Zealand region. The Nautilus 113(1): 4-42

plicatulum
Gastropods of New Zealand
Gastropods described in 1906